The 134th district of the Texas House of Representatives contains parts of Harris County. The current Representative is Ann Johnson, who was first elected in 2020.

References 

134